Juno is the debut studio album by American singer and songwriter Remi Wolf, released on October 15, 2021 through Island Records.

Critical reception

Juno received critical acclaim from music critics. At Metacritic, which assigns a normalised rating out of 100 to reviews from mainstream critics, the album has an average score of 85 out of 100, based on twelve reviews.

Track listing

References 

2021 debut albums